Biglycan is a small leucine-rich repeat proteoglycan (SLRP) which is found in a variety of extracellular matrix tissues, including bone, cartilage and tendon. In humans, biglycan is encoded by the BGN gene which is located on the X chromosome.

The name "biglycan" was proposed in an article by Fisher, Termine and Young in an article in the Journal of Biological Chemistry in 1989 because the proteoglycan contained two GAG chains; formerly it was known as proteoglycan-I (PG-I).

Structure 

Biglycan consists of a protein core containing leucine-rich repeat regions and two glycosaminoglycan (GAG) chains consisting of either chondroitin sulfate (CS) or dermatan sulfate (DS), with DS being more abundant in most connective tissues. The CS/DS chains are attached at amino acids 5 and 10 in human biglycan. The composition of the GAG chains has been reported as varying according to tissue of origin. Non-glycanated forms of biglycan (no GAG chains) increase with age in human articular cartilage.

The composition of GAG chains of biglycan and decorin originating from the same tissue has been reported to be similar.

The structure of biglycan core protein is highly conserved across species; over 90% homology has been reported for rat, mouse, bovine and human biglycan core proteins.

Function 

Biglycan is believed to play a role in the mineralization of bone. Knock-out mice that have had the gene for biglycan suppressed (Bgn -/-) have an osteoporosis-like phenotype with reduced growth rate  and lower bone mass than mice that can express biglycan.

Biglycan core protein binds to the growth factors BMP-4 and influences its bioactivity. It has also been reported that the presence of biglycan is necessary for BMP-4 to exert its effects on osteoblasts. There is also evidence that biglycan binds to TGF-beta 1.

Interactions 

Biglycan interacts with collagen, both via the core protein and GAG chains. It has been reported that biglycan interacts more strongly with collagen type II than collagen type I. Biglycan has been reported to compete with decorin for the same binding site on collagen.

Biglycan has been shown to interact with SGCA.

Biglycan is a particularly important proteoglycan for binding to lipoprotein in human blood vessels, thus being a significant cause of atherosclerosis.

References

External links
 
 

Proteoglycans
LRR proteins
Extracellular matrix proteins